Playing from 1909 to 1911, the Wabash Rockeries was the final nickname of the minor league baseball teams based in Wabash, Indiana between 1899 and 1911. Wabash teams played as members of the 1899 Indiana-Illinois League, the 1900 Indiana State League and Northern State of Indiana League from 1909 to 1911. Wabash won the 1900 and 1910 league championships. Wabash hosted home minor league games at City Park.

History
The Wabash team first played minor league baseball in 1899. In their first season of play, Wabash played in the six-team Indiana-Illinois League. The Wabash team ended the 1899 season with a record of 37–82, placing 4th as Poor served as the Wabash manager.

Wabash continued play in 1900, becoming members of the Indiana State League. The Wabash "Farmers" won a championship in a shortened season, as the Indiana State League played as a six–team league for the 1900 season. The league struggled during the season, as Elmwood moved from Logansport. On June 10, 1900, the  Elwood and Muncie both disbanded, causing the entire league to fold. The Wabash Farmers were in 1st place with a 19–9 record when the league disbanded. Wabash was just 0.5 game ahead of the 2nd place Anderson team. Newberger served as manager.

In 1909, the Wabash "Rockeries" were formed and became charter members of the six–team, Class D level Northern State of Indiana League. The Bluffton Babes, Huntington Johnnies, Kokomo Wild Cats, Lafayette Maroons and Marion Boosters joined Wabash in beginning league play on May 5, 1909.

The 1909 Wabash Rockeries are also referred to as the "Whitecaps." The team finished last in the Northern State of Indiana League standings. Under manager Charles Klunk, the Rockeries ended the 1909 season with a record of 35–72, placing 6th in the final standings. There was a standings tie for 1st place as the Bluffton Babes with a 65–38 record and .631 winning percentage finished with the Lafayette Maroons, who had a 66–39 record and .629 winning percentage, with Wabash 32.0 games behind. The league held no playoffs and utilized a regular season format throughout its existence.

The Wabash Rockeries rebounded from their last place finish and won the 1910 Northern State of Indiana League championship in a season of change. In 1910, the Northern State of Indiana League began the season with four teams. On July 2, 1910, the Bluffton Babes and Marion Boosters both joined league play. As a result, the games played prior to July 1, 1910, were not counted in the standings. With the league restarted, the Rockeries ended the 1910 season in 1st place with a record of 46–25. Playing under manager Eddie Pferferle, Wabash finished 3.5 games ahead of the 2nd place Bluffton Babes in the six–team league.

The Wabash Rockeries of the Northern State of Indiana League ended the 1911 season with a record of 30–35, placing 3rd in their final season. The 1911 season was the final season of play for the Northern State of Indiana League and Wabash. Playing under returning manager Eddie Pferferle, the Wabash Rockeries began league play on May 24, 1911. On July 28, 1911, the Bluffton (31–31) and Anderson (22–40) franchises folded. This occurred after the Logansport franchise moved to Anderson on July 2, 1911. The league briefly continued play before permanently folding on July 31, 1911. At the time the league folded, the Marion Boosters, with a record of 46–24, finished 6.0 games ahead of the 2nd place Huntington Indians in the six–team league. The Wabash Rockeries (30–35), Lafayette Farmers (28–37) were the remaining franchises in the last season of play.

Wabash, Indiana has not hosted another minor league team.

The ballpark
Wabash teams hosted minor league home games at City Park. Today, the site is within Wabash City Park, which still contains baseball facilities. The park was founded on January 23, 1889. Today, the 35–acre Wabash City Park contains three lighted ballfields and is located at 800 West Hill street.

Timeline

Yea–-by–year records

Notable alumni

Charles Fuller (1900)
George Mullin (1900)

References

External links
Wabash - Baseball Reference

Professional baseball teams in Indiana
Defunct baseball teams in Indiana
Baseball teams established in 1909
Baseball teams disestablished in 1911
1909 establishments in Indiana
1911 disestablishments in Indiana
Northern State of Indiana League teams
Wabash, Indiana